Dišnik  is a village in Croatia. It has about 343 residents and is situated northeast of Velika Bršljanica.

References

Populated places in Bjelovar-Bilogora County